May 19 - Eastern Orthodox Church calendar - May 21

All fixed commemorations below celebrated on June 2 by Orthodox Churches on the Old Calendar.

For May 20th, Orthodox Churches on the Old Calendar commemorate the Saints listed on May 7.

Saints
 Saint Lydia of Thyatira (Lydia of Philippi), mentioned in Acts 16:14-15 (1st century)
 Martyrs Thalelaeus the Unmercenary, at Anazarbus in Cilicia, and his companions Alexander and Asterius (284)
 Martyr Asclas of the Thebaid, Egypt (287)
 Sts. Zabulon and Susanna, of Cappadocia and Jerusalem (parents of St. Nina (Nino), enlightener of Georgia), (4th century)
 Saint Mark the Hermit (Marcus Eremita) (5th century)
 Holy Martyrs of Mamilla, Jerusalem (614)
 Saint Thalassius the Myrrh-gusher, of Libya (648)
 Saints John, Joseph and Nicetas, monks of Nea Moni on Chios (c. 1050)

Pre-Schism Western saints
 Saint Plautilla the Roman, martyr, (67)
 Hieromartyr Baudelius, missionary in France and northern Spain, martyred in Nîmes (2nd or 3rd century)
 Virgin-martyr Basilla (304)
 Saint Hilary (Hilarius, Hilaire), Bishop of Toulouse in France (360)
 Saint Anastasius, Bishop of Brescia in Lombardy, in Italy (610)
 Saint Austregisilus (Aoustrille, Outrille), Bishop of Bourges and Confessor (624)
 Saint Theodore of Pavia, Bishop of Pavia (778)
 Saint Ethelbert (Albert, Albright), King of East Anglia in England, martyr (794) (see also May 29)

Post-Schism Orthodox saints
 St. Daumantas (Timothy, Dovmont-Timothy), prince of Pskov (1299)
 Saint Stephen, Abbot of Piperi in Serbia (1697)

New martyrs and confessors
 New Hieromartyr Pavel Lazarev, martyred on the feast of Pentecost (1919)
 Venerable Olympiada Verbetska, Igumenia of Kozelschansk women's monastery of the Nativity of the Mother of God (1938)

Other commemorations
 Translation of the holy relics (1087) of Saint Nicholas the Wonderworker (343)  (see also: May 9 - Slavonic)
 Uncovering of the relics (1431) of St. Alexis, Metropolitan of Moscow, Wonderworker (1378)
 Repose of Schema-monk Cyriacus of Valaam (1798)

Icon gallery

Notes

References

Sources 
 May 20/June 2. Orthodox Calendar (PRAVOSLAVIE.RU).
 Complete List of Saints. Protection of the Mother of God Church (POMOG)
 May 20. OCA - The Lives of the Saints.
 Dr. Alexander Roman. May. Calendar of Ukrainian Orthodox Saints (Ukrainian Orthodoxy - Українське Православ'я).
 May 20. Latin Saints of the Orthodox Patriarchate of Rome.
 May 20. The Roman Martyrology.
Greek Sources
 Great Synaxaristes:  20 ΜΑΪΟΥ. ΜΕΓΑΣ ΣΥΝΑΞΑΡΙΣΤΗΣ.
  Συναξαριστής. 20 Μαΐου. ECCLESIA.GR. (H ΕΚΚΛΗΣΙΑ ΤΗΣ ΕΛΛΑΔΟΣ). 
Russian Sources
  2 июня (20 мая). Православная Энциклопедия под редакцией Патриарха Московского и всея Руси Кирилла (электронная версия). (Orthodox Encyclopedia - Pravenc.ru).
  20 мая (ст.ст.) 2 июня 2013 (нов. ст.). Русская Православная Церковь Отдел внешних церковных связей. (DECR).

May in the Eastern Orthodox calendar